Common names: Andean forest-pitviper.
Bothrops pulcher is a venomous pitviper species found in South America. The specific name is Latin, meaning "beautiful", in reference to the color pattern. No subspecies are currently recognized.

Description
A small and moderately slender species, only two lengths are given by Campbell and Lamar (2004): 76.4 cm for a specimen from Colombia and 65.9 cm for the type of Bothrops alticola, although the tail was incomplete.

The scalation includes 19-23 (usually 21) rows of keeled dorsal scales, 167-178/173-181 ventral scales in males/females and 63-64/53-60 subcaudal scales in males/females, with a varying number towards the end of the tail being divided. On the head there are 5-8 keeled intersupraocular scales, 7-9 (usually 7) supralabial scales, the second of which contacts the prelacunal, and 8-10 sublabial scales.

The color pattern consists of a greenish yellow or medium to dark green ground color that usually becomes more obscure towards the front of the body. The dorsal pattern is a series of 29 bands or transverse black spots that tend to fuse with each other towards the front part of the body. All of this is overlaid with a pattern of white dorsal keels. The belly is yellow with black mottling that usually increases down the body so that the tail is a uniform dark color. The end of the tail tends to be cream or pink with a rounded terminal spine. On the head, a cheek stripe is present that extends to the angle of the mouth. Above it is a parallel black stripe that runs from the supraoculars to the angle of the jaw. The labial scales are usually a very dark green color without any mottling. The iris is yellow and the tongue black.

Geographic range
Found in South America on the eastern slopes of the Andes from south-central Colombia to southern Ecuador and northern Peru. The type locality given is "Quito" (Ecuador); a mistake according to Peters (1955).

References

External links
 

pulcher
Fauna of the Andes
Snakes of South America
Reptiles of Colombia
Reptiles of Ecuador
Reptiles of Peru
Reptiles described in 1862
Taxa named by Wilhelm Peters